Nadakame Ulakam is a 2011 Malayalam-language comedy film directed by Viji Thampi and starring Mukesh, Vinu Mohan, Sarayu, and Saranya Mohan in the lead roles. Its songs are composed by veteran music director Johnson with lyrics penned by Kaithapram Damodaran Namboothiri. The film released on 25 February.

Plot
Omanakuttan (Mukesh), is a Bank Manager by profession. But he is very interested stage plays and he himself has directed and acted in many plays. He is approached by a film crew from town headed by Pavan (Suraj Venjaramoodu), to produce their debut venture. Omanakuttan who is a cinema aspirant, agrees to finance the film after he was offered the lead role. Eventually, he learns that neither Pavanan nor his associates know anything about film making. Omanakuttan decides himself to script and direct the film. He completes the film successfully with a limited cast but fails to find a distributor. To find a distributor, Omanakuttan goes to Chennai but fate had something else planned for him there. His bag gets stolen and while chasing the thief, he gets hit by a car. However, the car was that of an accomplished film producer and distributor (Siddhiq). After hearing the story of Omanakuttan, he decides to distribute the film, which became a super hit in the box office.

Cast

Soundtrack
"Thevarapoo Malayil (male)" - K. J. Yesudas
"Vanamaali Ninnodakkuzhalil" - K. S. Chithra, Vijay Yesudas
"Pookkila Chithary" - M. G. Sreekumar, Chorus
"Thevarapoo Malayil (female)" - K. S. Chithra

References

External links
 
 
 Nadakame Ulakam at Oneindia.in

2010s Malayalam-language films
2011 comedy films
2011 films
Films scored by Johnson
Indian comedy films
Films shot in Chennai
Films directed by Viji Thampi